Niko Xhaçka (born 12 January 1944) is an Albanian footballer. He played in three matches for the Albania national football team from 1965 to 1967.

References

1944 births
Living people
Albanian footballers
Albania international footballers
Place of birth missing (living people)
Association footballers not categorized by position